Le Tilleul is a commune in the Seine-Maritime department in the Normandy region in northern France.

Geography

Heraldry

Population

Places of interest
 The church of St. Martin, dating from the fifteenth century.
 The eighteenth-century chateau of Fréfossé.
 The cliffs and beach, which in 2007, provided the backdrop for some scenes in the film La Disparue de Deauville, starring Sophie Marceau.

See also
Communes of the Seine-Maritime department

References

Communes of Seine-Maritime